The Oxford Sandy and Black is a breed of domestic pig originating in Oxfordshire. Named for its colour, which is a base of sandy brown with black patches, the breed is also sometimes called the "Plum Pudding" or "Oxford Forest pig." Related to the old Berkshire and Tamworth breeds, it is one of the oldest pig breeds native to Britain. 

The Oxford Sandy and Black is a hardy, docile pig suited to being reared outdoors, where its colour protects it from sunburn (which pink pigs tend to suffer from). The breed has twice neared extinction, but is recovering, partly thanks to the efforts of the breed association, the Oxford Sandy & Black Pig Society.

References

Pig breeds originating in England